Elsa Hunter (born 15 February 2005), also known as Elsa Siow Tzin Yee, is an Australian–Malaysian cricketer who plays for the Malaysian women's national cricket team. She made her T20I debut at the age of 13, against Nepal in the 2019 Thailand Women's T20 Smash.

Hunter moved to Australia in 2015. She resides at Western Sydney and trains at Penrith. Along with playing club cricket at Sydney, she also played for New South Wales Under-19 women's team. 

On a trip to Malaysia, Hunter's father contacted the CEO of Malaysian Cricket Association to suggest training for her daughter. After showing a video of how her daughter played the game, Hunter was immediately selected in the national team. She made her debut in the 2019 Thailand Women's T20 Smash at the age of thirteen, holding the record for the youngest international cricketer at that time, male or female.

She scored her maiden Women's Twenty20 International fifty against Singapore in the 2022 Saudari Cup. She represented Malaysia in the 2022 Women's Asia Cup.

References

External links 
 
 Grassroots Greats: International Cricket at 14 - Elsa Hunter plays professionally for Malaysia – video profile by ABC Australia

2005 births
Living people
Cricketers from Sydney
Australian women cricketers
Malaysian women cricketers
Malaysia women Twenty20 International cricketers
Australian people of Malaysian descent
Australian sportspeople of Chinese descent
Malaysian sportspeople of Chinese descent